S. John Hogan is a professor of Applied Mathematics and leader  of the "Applied Nonlinear Mathematics Group" in the Department of Engineering Mathematics,  University of Bristol. He is known for his work in numerous applications of non-linear dynamics including water waves liquid crystals.

Hogan is principal investigator on several large EPSRC grants, in 2008 totalling around £6M – an unusually high total for a UK mathematician. These include  the  "Bristol Centre for Complexity Sciences", the "Bristol Centre for Applied Nonlinear Mathematics", "Applied Nonlinear Mathematics: Making it Real" and

Recent publications
 2006  Impact dynamics of large dimensional systems Homer ME and Hogan SJ
 2005  Real-time dynamic sub structuring in a coupled oscillator-pendulum system Kyrychko YN, Blyuss KB, Gonzalez-Buelga A, Hogan SJ and Wagg DJ
 2005  Two-parameter nonsmooth grazing bifurcations of limit cycles: classification and open problems Kowalczyk PS, di Bernardo M, Champneys AR, Hogan SJ, Homer ME, Kuznetsov YA, Nordmark A and Piiroinen PT
 2004  Global dynamics of low immersion high-speed milling Szalai R, Stepan G and Hogan SJ

References

External links
 Page at University of Bristol

Year of birth missing (living people)
Living people
English mathematicians
Academics of the University of Bristol